The rufous-tailed stipplethroat or rufous-tailed antwren (Epinecrophylla erythrura) is a species of insectivorous bird in the antbird family Thamnophilidae. It was formerly placed in the genus Myrmotherula.  It is found in Brazil, Colombia, Ecuador, and Peru. Its natural habitat is subtropical or tropical moist lowland forests.

Taxonomy
The rufous-tailed stipplethroat was described and illustrated by the English zoologist Philip Sclater in 1890 and given the binomial name Hypocnemis erythrura. The current genus Epinecrophylla was erected in 2006.

Two subspecies are recognized:
E. e. erythrura (Sclater, PL, 1890) - southeastern Colombia to northeastern Peru and northwestern Brazil. 
E. e. septentrionalis (Zimmer, JT, 1932) - from eastern Peru and the western Amazon basin

Description
The male has olive-brown upper parts with a chestnut back and tail, and pale tips to the wing coverts. The throat and breast are grey, sometimes with a dark "scaled" effect, and the belly is olive brown. The female is similar but the throat and breast are buff-ochre and the belly dull brown. In both sexes, the iris is red or orange and the bill is dark. The male is the only member of the genus without a contrasting throat patch. The female is similar in appearance to the rufous-backed stipplethroat (Epinecrophylla haematonota), but that has no chestnut on its back. The song is a high-pitched, rather squeaky series of notes.

Distribution
The rufous-tailed stipplethroat is endemic to the moist tropical forests of northern South America. Its range includes western Brazil, southeastern Colombia, eastern Ecuador and eastern Peru.

Ecology
The rufous-tailed stipplethroat often feeds in pairs or small groups, often joining mixed flocks of small birds flitting through the lower parts of the canopy, often foraging higher in the trees than other related species. The diet consists of insects and spiders, most of which are found by probing into rolled-up leaves. The nest is a dome-shaped construction with a side-entrance; breeding takes place in February in Ecuador.

Conservation status
The rufous-tailed stipplethroat is a fairly common species with a very wide range. The population appears to be stable and the International Union for Conservation of Nature has assessed its conservation status as being of "least concern".

References

rufous-tailed stipplethroat
Birds of the Amazon Basin
Birds of the Colombian Amazon
Birds of the Ecuadorian Amazon
Birds of the Peruvian Amazon
rufous-tailed stipplethroat
rufous-tailed stipplethroat
Taxonomy articles created by Polbot